Fairbank is a city in Buchanan and Fayette counties in the U.S. state of Iowa. The population was 1,111 at the time of the 2020 census.

Geography

Demographics

2010 census
As of the census of 2010, there were 1,113 people, 461 households, and 307 families living in the city. The racial makeup of the city was 98.0% White, 0.3% African American, 0.1% Native American, 0.4% from other races, and 1.3% from two or more races. Hispanic or Latino of any race were 1.8% of the population.

There were 461 households, of which 32.3% had children under the age of 18 living with them, 55.7% were married couples living together, 6.1% had a female householder with no husband present, 4.8% had a male householder with no wife present, and 33.4% were non-families. 27.5% of all households were made up of individuals, and 14.3% had someone living alone who was 65 years of age or older. The average household size was 2.41 and the average family size was 2.98.

The median age in the city was 37.6 years. 26.9% of residents were under the age of 18; 6% were between the ages of 18 and 24; 25.7% were from 25 to 44; 25.8% were from 45 to 64; and 15.5% were 65 years of age or older. The gender makeup of the city was 49.3% male and 50.7% female.

2000 census
As of the census of 2000, there were 1,041 people, 418 households, and 290 families living in the city. The racial makeup of the city was 99.42% White, 0.10% African American, 0.10% Native American, 0.10% Asian, 0.19% from other races, and 0.10% from two or more races. 0.96% of the population was Hispanic or Latino of any race.

There were 418 households, out of which 34.2% had children under the age of 18 living with them, 58.9% were married couples living together, 7.2% had a female householder with no husband present, and 30.6% were non-families. 26.8% of all households were made up of individuals, and 13.9% had someone living alone who was 65 years of age or older. The average household size was 2.49 and the average family size was 3.03.

In the city, the population was spread out, with 28.1% under the age of 18, 6.9% from 18 to 24, 28.3% from 25 to 44, 21.8% from 45 to 64, and 14.8% who were 65 years of age or older. The median age was 37 years. For every 100 females, there were 95.3 males. For every 100 females age 18 and over, there were 87.9 males.

The median income for a household in the city was $36,900, and the median income for a family was $43,654. Males had a median income of $31,000 versus $23,333 for females. The per capita income for the city was $17,262. About 4.9% of families and 8.9% of the population were below the poverty line, including 12.0% of those under age 18 and 11.0% of those age 65 or over.

Education
The Wapsie Valley Community School District operates local public schools.  The community of Fairbank is served by Wapsie Valley High School.

Notable people
Chris Jans, former head men's basketball coach at New Mexico State University. Current head coach at Mississippi State.

References

External links
  
 City of Fairbank official website

Cities in Buchanan County, Iowa
Cities in Fayette County, Iowa
Cities in Iowa